Panisagar railway station is located at Panisagar in Tripura, India. It is an Indian railway station of the Lumding–Sabroom line in the Northeast Frontier Railway zone of Indian Railways. The station is situated at  Panisagar in  North Tripura district in the Indian state of Tripura. Total 8 Passengers trains halt in the station.

History
Panisagar railway station became operation in 2008 with the metre-gauge line from Lumding to Agartala but later in 2016 entire section converted into broad-gauge line.

Details 
The station lies on the 312 km-long  broad-gauge Lumding–Sabroom railway line which comes under the Lumding railway division of the Northeast Frontier Railway zone of Indian Railways. It is a single line without electrification.

Services 
 2 trains per day run between Agartala and Dharmanagar. The train stops at Panisagar station.
 1 train per day runs between Agartala and Silchar. The train stops at Panisagar station.

Station

Station layout

Platforms 
There are 2 platforms and 3 tracks. The platforms are connected by foot overbridge.

References

External links
 Indian Railways site
 Indian railway fan club

Railway stations in West Tripura district
Railway stations opened in 2008
Lumding railway division